The first government of Hussein Arnous was formed on 30 August 2020 and took the oath of office on 2 September 2020. A new Council of Ministers was formed by Hussein Arnous at the appointment of President Bashar al-Assad. This government was the 94th since Syria gained independence from the Ottoman Empire in 1918 and was the seventh during the presidency of President Bashar al-Assad.

Ministers 

 Hussein Arnous, Prime Minister of Syria
 Ali Abdullah Ayyoub, Deputy Prime Minister, Minister of Defense
 Faisal Mekdad, Foreign Affairs and Expatriates Minister
 Mohammad Khaled al-Rahmoun, Interior Minister
 Ahmad al-Sayyed, Justice Minister
 Kenan Yaghi, Finance Minister
 Mohammad Samer al-Khalil, Economy and Foreign Trade Minister	
 Talal Al-Barazi, Internal Trade and Consumer Protection Minister	
 Ziyad Sabbagh, Industry Minister
 Zouhair Khazim, Transport Minister
 Tammam Raad, Water Resources Minister
 Bassam Tohme, Minister of Oil and Mineral Reserves
 Ghassan al-Zamel, Electricity Minister
 Iyad Mohammad al-Khatib, Communications and Technology Minister
 Salwa Abdullah, Minister of Social Affairs and Labor
 Suhail Mohammad Abdullatif, Public Works and Housing Minister	
 Mohammed Hassan Qatana, Agriculture and Agrarian Reform Minister
 Hussein Makhlouf, Local Administration Minister
 Imad Abullah Sarah, Information Minister
 Mohammad Abdul-Sattar al-Sayyed, Awqaf (Religious Endowments) Minister
 Hassan al-Ghabbash, Health Minister
 Darem Tabbaa, Education Minister	
 Bassam Bashir Ibrahim, Higher Education Minister	
 Lubanah Mshaweh, Minister of Culture
 Mohammad Rami Radwan Martini, Tourism Minister
 Salam Mohammad al-Saffaf, Administrative Development Minister
 Mansour Fadlallah Azzam, Presidential Affairs Minister
 Mohammad Fayez al-Barasha, State Minister 
 Maloul al-Hussein, State Minister
 Mohammad Samir Haddad, State Minister

The government came after the Syrian parliamentary elections in 2020, and the cabinet included twenty-nine ministers, including fifteen former ministers, and fourteen new ministers.

One minister with another portfolio in previous government, Dr. Salwa Abdullah, was appointed Minister of Social Affairs and Labor.
The government has also witnessed the reappointment of Dr. Lubana Mushawah as Minister of Culture, who was Minister of Culture in the First Wael al-Halqi government.

Ministerial changes
Following the death of Walid Muallem on November 16, Presidential Decree No. 322 of November 22, 2020 was issued, which was Dr. Faisal Mekdad appointed Minister of Foreign Affairs and Expatriates.

See also 
 Cabinet of Syria
 Government ministries of Syria

References

External links
Official Gov Page

Bashar al-Assad
2020 establishments in Syria
Cabinets established in 2020
Governments of Syria
2021 disestablishments in Syria
Cabinets disestablished in 2021
2020s in Syrian politics